Selvarajah Kajendran (born 29 October 1974) is a Sri Lankan Tamil politician and a Member of Parliament of Sri Lanka.

Early life
Kajendran was born on 29 October 1974. He was president of the Jaffna University Student Union in 2001/02.

Career
Kajendran was selected by the militant Liberation Tigers of Tamil Eelam (LTTE) to be one of the Tamil National Alliance's (TNA) candidates in Jaffna District at the 2004 parliamentary election. He was elected and entered Parliament. In March 2010 Kajendran, along with fellow TNA MPs Gajendrakumar Ponnambalam and Pathmini Sithamparanathan, left the TNA and formed the Tamil National People's Front (TNPF).

Kajendran contested the 2010 parliamentary election as one of the TNPF's candidates in Jaffna District but the TNPF failed to win any seats in Parliament. In February 2011 Kajendran became general secretary of the TNPF. He contested the 2015 parliamentary election as one of the TNPF's candidates in Jaffna District but again the TNPF failed to win any seats in Parliament.

Electoral history

References

External links

1974 births
Living people
Members of the 13th Parliament of Sri Lanka
People from Northern Province, Sri Lanka
Sri Lankan Hindus
Sri Lankan Tamil politicians
Tamil National Alliance politicians
Members of the 16th Parliament of Sri Lanka